The Westmeath county football team represents Westmeath in men's Gaelic football and is governed by Westmeath GAA, the county board of the Gaelic Athletic Association. The team competes in the three major annual inter-county competitions; the All-Ireland Senior Football Championship, the Leinster Senior Football Championship and the National Football League.

Westmeath's home ground is Cusack Park, Mullingar. The team's manager is Dessie Dolan.

The team last won the Leinster Senior Championship in 2004, have won the All-Ireland Senior Championship five times and the National League five times.

History
Westmeath's history is that of a minor county which only recently rose to the higher ranks of football. Its 2004 Leinster Senior Football Championship (SFC) provincial title was presaged by a 1995 All-Ireland Minor Football Championship (MFC) title and victory in the 1999 All-Ireland Under-21 Football Championship.

1935–1995
Another generation of Westmeath players took part in the first week-night fixture in the GAA championship: on 20 June 1935 they played Meath in Kells and lost by a scoreline of 2–7 to 0–9. The footballers won the 1929 Leinster Junior Football Championship (JFC), lost to Dublin by ten points in 1960 and then defeated Dublin to reach the 1931 Leinster SFC final. The team defeated Carlow, Laois and Offaly to advance to a 1949 Leinster SFC final against Meath, but was well beaten on both occasions. Twenty years later the team reached the National Football League semi-final. Westmeath defeated Dublin again in the 1967 Leinster SFC and the 1984 Centenary Cup campaign and qualified for a second League semi-final in 1994.

2001–present
In 2001, the team went on an All-Ireland SFC run that lasted for an unprecedented nine games, including an extra-time win against Mayo in Roscommon. Prominent players in this campaign were Ger Heavin, Dessie Dolan, Rory O'Connell, Damien Healy and David Mitchell, with other players occasionally coming to prominence, including Martin Flanaghan, Fergal Wilson, Paul Conway, David O'Shaughnessy and Fergal Murray. The team's campaign ended when it lost to Meath in a 2001 All-Ireland SFC quarter-final replay. Uneventful 2002 and 2003 seasons followed and Westmeath parted terms with its then manager, Luke Dempsey.

Former Kerry player and manager Páidí Ó Sé was brought in to manage the senior team some months later, after he had been removed from his role as Kerry senior manager. The following year, under the management of Ó Sé, Westmeath progressed to the 2004 Leinster Senior Football Championship Final and won a first ever Leinster SFC title with a replayed victory over Laois (having previously beaten Wexford, Dublin and Offaly). However, the team tamely exited its second All-Ireland SFC quarter-final — losing to Derry. That campaign is covered in the documentary film Marooned.

Ó Sé quit Westmeath at the end of a poor 2005 season and his assistant Tomás Ó Flatharta replaced him. After a poor league campaign, in which the team nevertheless secured promotion from Division 2, Offaly knocked Westmeath out of the Leinster SFC in the first round. However, wins over London, Limerick, Sligo and, then, a historic defeat of Galway, at Pearse Stadium in Salthill, set up a third All-Ireland SFC quarter-final for the team in six years — against Dublin on this occasion. Westmeath did not live up to expectations in that game and sustained a ten-point defeat.

Westmeath staged a strong second half display to capture the 2008 Division 2 National Football League title for the third time, and the first since 2003 following a five-point win over Dublin at Páirc Tailteann in Navan. The scoreline in that game was Westmeath 0–15, Dublin 0–10.

Dublin defeated Westmeath by 27 points in the 2009 Leinster SFC quarter-final. Ó Flatharta resigned as Westmeath manager after the team's defeat to neighbour Meath on 11 July 2009.

The county board, searching for a manager after the resignation of Ó Flatharta, appointed Brendan Hackett as manager in September 2009, with the choice of someone who had not managed at that level for many years seen as unexpected. Hackett included Michael Carruth as a masseur and Eoin Rheinisch as part of "physical preparations" on his backroom team. Westmeath embarked on a second successive league campaign without winning a game and the team was relegated to Division 3 of the National Football League. Hackett resigned in April 2010. He did not contest a single championship match.

Under the management of Tom Cribbin the team reached consecutive Leinster SFC finals in 2015 and 2016. This was a first in the team's history. The team also won the 2017 NFL Division 4 title. Colin Kelly was appointed Cribbin's successor as Westmeath manager on a two-year term in late 2017 but left in mid-2018, citing family commitments.

Jack Cooney's appointment as Westmeath senior manager was ratified in September 2018, making him the first Westmeath native to fill the role since 1992. Under Cooney's management the team won the 2019 O'Byrne Cup, its first time to win that competition since 1988. Later that year it won the 2019 NFL Division 3 title. In 2022, Westmeath won the inaugural Tailteann Cup, defeating Cavan in the final at Croke Park. Cooney resigned unexpectedly the following month, and was succeeded by Dessie Dolan.

Current panel

Current management team
Manager: Dessie Dolan
Selectors: John Keane, Cathal Mullin and Mick Dillon
 
John Keane, joined ahead of the 2022 season under Dolan's predecessor Jack Cooney, retained by Dolan as coach
Performance coach: Jason Sherlock

Managerial history
Westmeath have a history of appointing "foreign" managers, with Páidí Ó Sé the most successful appointment; Ó Sé led Westmeath to the 2004 Leinster SFC (a first in the team's history).

Pat Flanagan was initially appointed as interim manager in April 2010 following Brendan Hackett's departure.

Players

Notable players

Records

Top scorers
Championship only, as of game played 9 July 2022.

All Stars
Westmeath has 5 All Stars, as of 2008. 4 different players have won, as of 2008.

Winners

2001: Rory O'Connell
2004: Dessie Dolan1st win, 3rd nomination
2004: John Keane
2008: Gary Connaughton1st win, 3rd nomination
2008: John Keane2nd win

Nominations

1999: Dessie Dolan
2001: Dessie Dolan2nd nomination
2001: Ger Heavin
2001: David Mitchell
2004: Gary Connaughton
2004: Donal O'Donoghue
2004: Denis Glennon
2006: Gary Connaughton2nd nomination
2008: Michael Ennis
2015: Kieran Martin

Honours

National
Tailteann Cup
 Winners (1): 2022
National Football League Division 2
 Winners (3):2000–01, 2003, 2006, 2008
National Football League Division 3
 Winners (1): 2019
National Football League Division 4
 Winners (1): 2017
National Football League Cup
 Winners (1): 1982–83
All-Ireland Under-21 Football Championship
 Winners (1): 1999
All-Ireland Minor Football Championship
 Winners (1): 1995
 Runners-up (1): 1963

Provincial
Leinster Senior Football Championship
 Winners (1): 2004
 Runners-up (4): 1931, 1949, 2015, 2016
O'Byrne Cup
 Winners (4): 1959, 1980, 1988, 2019
Leinster Junior Football Championship
 Winners (4): 1905, 1915, 1929, 1940
Leinster Under-21 Football Championship
 Winners (2): 1999, 2000
 Runners-up (3): 1995, 1997, 2010
Leinster Minor Football Championship
 Winners (5): 1939, 1952, 1963, 1995, 2000
 Runners-up (5): 1951, 1982, 1984, 1992, 2013

References

External links
 "Hackett wrong man to steady Westmeath ship". Independent.ie.

 
County football teams